The magpie starling (Speculipastor bicolor) is a member of the starling family from eastern Africa.

Description
The white patches at base of primaries are obvious in flight. The male is a shiny blue-black on upperparts, head and upper breast, with mostly white below and bloodred eyes. The female is a dull blackish above with dark grey crown, and a dark grey throat is separated from white belly by a glossy black breast band. Her eyes are red or orange-red. The Juvenile is brown with a white belly; eyes brown, becoming orange-red in as the bird matures. Exceptional young birds are entirely white below, including chin and throat.
 
The call is a prolonged soft babbling quereeeh quaaa kereek quak-quak, suaaaa, cherak-chik-chak...mixed higher harsh notes.

Distribution and habitat
It is a gregarious nomadic pied starling of dry brush and thorn-scrub in northern and eastern Kenya. It is also found in Ethiopia, Somalia, South Sudan, Tanzania, and Uganda.

References

Dale A. Zimmerman, Birds of Kenya and Northern Tanzania, Princeton University Press, 1999

External links
Image at ADW

Sturnidae
Birds of East Africa
Birds described in 1879